The Milkmaid is a 2020 Nigerian drama film directed by Desmond Ovbiagele. It was selected as the Nigerian entry for the Best International Feature Film at the 93rd Academy Awards, but it was not nominated. The film stars Anthonieta Kalunta, Gambo Usman Kona, and Maryam Booth.

Cast
 Anthonieta Kalunta as Aisha
 Maryam Booth as Zainab
 Gambo Usman Kona as Dangana
 Patience Okpala as Hauwa
 Ibrahim Jammal as Haruna

Accolades
At the 16th African Movie Academy Awards, the film was nominated for eight awards, ultimately winning Best Film, Best Film in an African Language, Best Actress in a Supporting Role, Best Makeup, and Best Nigerian Film. The Milkmaid also won the Narrative Feature Award at the 2021 Pan African Film Festival in Los Angeles.

Awards and nominations

See also
 List of submissions to the 93rd Academy Awards for Best International Feature Film
 List of Nigerian submissions for the Academy Award for Best International Feature Film

References

External links
 

2020 films
2020 drama films
Nigerian drama films
Hausa-language films